Chesterfield, originally known as Recklesstown, is an unincorporated community located around the intersection of County Route 528 (Bordentown-Chesterfield Road, Chesterfield-Arneytown Road) and County Route 677 (Chesterfield-Georgetown Road) in Chesterfield Township of Burlington County, New Jersey.

History
In the 1830s, the village had a store, hotel, church, and post office. The village was originally named after Joseph Reckless, who had bought a mill here in 1712. His grandsons, Anthony and Robert, served in the American Revolutionary War. The name of the community was changed to Chesterfield in 1888 by congressman Anthony Bullock. The oldest part of the Recklesstown Tavern, now the Chesterfield Inn, was built . The tavern was expanded in 1774.

Historic district

The Recklesstown Historic District is a  historic district encompassing the village. It was added to the National Register of Historic Places on August 19, 1975, for its significance in agriculture, religion, and transportation. The district includes 49 contributing buildings. The Kessler House is a two and one-half story brick building built . The Chesterfield Baptist Church was built in 1848 and features Greek Doric columns. Across the street is the Clayton House, once the church rectory, now a florist.

Notable people
 Charles Newbold (1764–1835), blacksmith, invented the first one piece cast iron plow, patented in 1797

See also
 National Register of Historic Places listings in Burlington County, New Jersey
 List of turnpikes in New Jersey

References

External links
 

Chesterfield Township, New Jersey
Unincorporated communities in Burlington County, New Jersey
Unincorporated communities in New Jersey